Lyudmila Shumilova (born August 2, 1969) is a Kazakhstani modern pentathlete. She placed 30th in the women's individual event at the 2004 Summer Olympics.

References

1969 births
Living people
Kazakhstani female modern pentathletes
Olympic modern pentathletes of Kazakhstan
Modern pentathletes at the 2004 Summer Olympics
Asian Games medalists in modern pentathlon
Modern pentathletes at the 2002 Asian Games
Asian Games bronze medalists for Kazakhstan
Medalists at the 2002 Asian Games
Asian Games gold medalists for Kazakhstan
21st-century Kazakhstani women